The Pokhara Rangasala is a multi-purpose stadium in Pokhara, Gandaki Province, Nepal. It has a capacity of 16,500 spectators. The venue is located to the south of Pokhara at Rambazaar on the eastern bank of Seti river.

History

The facility comprises a football stadium surrounded by an athletics track of 400m, one 7-A side football ground, a volleyball court, a basketball court, cricket ground and covered hall for games like badminton, karate and other indoor sports. The administrative building of Kaski district sports office and ANFA Kaski lies here. It is the only venue in Nepal beside Dasarath Rangasala Stadium to host international football matches and beside Tribhuvan University International Cricket Ground to host international cricket matches. The stadium has hosted several international friendly matches of the Nepal national football team. 
The other facilities near the stadium are used to host volleyball, basketball, cricket, wrestling, boxing and badminton.

Hosted events
International games:
2019 South Asian Games

Football:
 Aaha Gold Cup (yearly)
 Selected matches of the Nepal national football team
 Football at the 2019 South Asian Games – Women's tournament
Martyr's Memorial A-Division League
9th National Games of Nepal

Cricket:
 Pokhara Premier League
 Cricket at the 2019 South Asian Games – Women's tournament

International records

Women's Twenty20 International centuries
Two WT20I centuries have been scored at the venue.

Women's Twenty20 International five-wicket hauls
One WT20I five-wicket haul has been taken at this venue.

References

Football venues in Nepal
Multi-purpose stadiums in Nepal
Buildings and structures in Pokhara
Sport in Pokhara
2004 establishments in Nepal